Kisasszond is a village in Somogy county, Hungary.

Etymology
According to the local legends its name came from the nuns of the monastery that stood there in the Middle Ages. Others state that it got its name from Katalin Bethlen who was the owner of Kisasszond and died as a young girl. The older version of the name of the settlement was Kisasszonyfalva. The church of Kisasszond was dedicated to Holy Mary. Kisasszony is one of her titles which got a suffix -d like many other settlements in Hungary.

History
According to László Szita the settlement was completely Hungarian in the 18th century.

External links 
 Street map (Hungarian)

References 

Populated places in Somogy County